Hailai Arghandiwal (born 22 April 1996) is a professional soccer player who plays as a midfielder. Born in the United States, she represented the Afghanistan national team.

Club career
Arghandiwal agreed a transfer to Italian Serie A club Florentia in December 2018. She became an MSV Duisburg player in 2019.

International career
In 2010, as a 14-year-old high school pupil from Northern California, Arghandiwal was selected for the Afghanistan national team at the 2010 SAFF Women's Championship in Bangladesh. Her experiences at the tournament inspired her to become a campaigner for women's rights in Afghanistan. She was the national team captain at the 2012 SAFF Women's Championship in Sri Lanka.

She played in the Oakland Roots' Justice Match on 10 October 2020.

International goals

References

External links
 
 
 
 Profile at Santa Clara Broncos

1996 births
Living people
Afghan women's footballers
Afghanistan women's international footballers
Florentia San Gimignano S.S.D. players
Expatriate women's footballers in Italy
Serie A (women's football) players
Afghan expatriates in Italy
American people of Afghan descent
Santa Clara Broncos women's soccer players
Soccer players from San Francisco
People from Dublin, California
Women's association football midfielders
MSV Duisburg (women) players
Afghan expatriates in Germany
Frauen-Bundesliga players